Pinnayur East is a village in Thanjavur district of the Indian state of Tamil Nadu. It is located in Orathanadu taluk.

Demographics 

 census, Pinnaiyur West had a population of 2,384. The total population constitute, 1,163 males and 1,221 females —a sex ratio of 1050 females per 1000 males. 190 children are in the age group of 0–6 years, of which 95 are boys and 95 are girls. The average literacy rate stands at 80.45% with 1,765 literates.

References 

Villages in Thanjavur district